Creeting St Mary is a village and civil parish in the Mid Suffolk district of Suffolk in eastern England. Sandwiched between the A14 and A140 to the north of Needham Market, the parish also includes the hamlet of Creeting Bottoms. In 2005 the parish population was 710, which decreased to 697 at the 2011 Census.

Heritage
The buck of a windmill survives in the village. It was used as a dovecote after ceasing to be a windmill.

St Mary's Church has been listed grade II* by English Heritage. The parish was originally in the Hundred of Bosmere and Claydon.

Notable people
John Austin (1790–1859), legal thinker responsible for the theory of legal positivism, was born here, the eldest son of the miller.
Michael Peck (born 1967), a first-class cricketer, was born here.

Amenities
The village has a voluntarily aided Church of England primary school with 80–90 pupils. The Victorian building of the school, still in use for some classes, dates from 1871.

The village also has a charitable pre-school based in the Diamond Jubilee Hall. There are public playground facilities in Blacksmiths Field.

Creeting St Mary has a pub/restaurant, The Highwayman, and several other catering, retail and service outlets. Semi-soft Suffolk Gold cheese has been made here since 2004 by a family firm.

References

External links

Village website

 
Villages in Suffolk
Civil parishes in Suffolk
Mid Suffolk District